High Stakes (also known as Melanie Rose) is a 1989 thriller-drama film starring Sally Kirkland and features Sarah Michelle Gellar in a supporting role. Kathy Bates also has a minor role.

Plot
A lonely stockbroker looking for intimacy on Wall Street ends up helping a prostitute and her daughter in trouble with a crime boss.

Cast
Sally Kirkland as Bambi/Melanie Rose
Sarah Michelle Gellar as Karen Rose
Richard Lynch as Slim
Kathy Bates as Jill
Robert LuPone as John Stratton

References

External links
 

1989 films
1980s thriller drama films
1989 thriller films
1989 drama films